Lambda Pi Upsilon Sorority, Latinas Poderosas Unidas, Inc, is a Latina oriented sorority founded at SUNY Geneseo by six women who believed that the problems of womanhood, particularly those of Latinas, needed to be addressed and resolved on campus by seeking unity, cultural identity, and growth of mind as a whole group.

Established on November 6, 1992, Lambda Pi Upsilon Sorority Inc. seeks to show their commitment and desire to help educate others through programs and social events that address issues involving their community, youth, and womanhood. Lambda Pi Upsilon's essence is based on education, commitment, and aspirations that reflect the beliefs of the Founding Mothers and accentuate strong leadership qualities that their members possess.

The sorority is a member of the National Association of Latino Fraternal Organizations (NALFO).

History 
Inception: Lambda Pi Upsilon began with six women who sought to fight and address increasing social issues involving women in their community, particularly Latina women. They believed that, as a whole and working as a close support system, they could provide other women, especially Latinas, with the strength and aspirations needed to succeed. Located on a predominantly caucasian campus, these six women were driven to find a sense of unity and commonality by approaching the ideas of cultural identity and growth of mind. Referred to as the Six Pillars of Strength, these women are:

Founding Mothers
 Founding Mother #1: Sandra Mosquera-Valerio
 Founding Mother #2: Lisette Pineda
 Founding Mother #3: Maria Fritz-Rodriguez
 Founding Mother #4: Glorivy Arce
 Founding Mother #5: Ebony Robinson
 Founding Mother #6: Nancy Martinez

Together these women believed that by providing a sisterly networks of strengths, women could confront the challenges they were faced with, and gain a sense of empowerment that would defy social issues, and lead them to success. Their motivation, faith, ambition, and vision lead them to experience what is known as the Lambda Way. Disregarding the social and political challenges they faced, they succeeded in 1992 in creating Lambda Pi Upsilon Sorority Inc., a path in which all women can follow, based on six founding principles. These six founding principles are: Family, Advancement, Education, Motivation, Learning, and Exposure.

Since its inception, Hermanas of Lambda Pi Upsilon aim to maintain and uphold these six founding principles. The Hermandad has remained on the front of exerting these six founding principles by creating a commitment to education, family, cultural awareness, and above all, to each other.

Hermanas Para Siempre Con Amor, Dignidad, y Orgullo.

Philanthropy 
As an organization, Lambda Pi Upsilon decided to adopt children as part of their philanthropic research. However, with the death of one of their members from asthma, Lambda Pi Upsilon has also focused its attentions on asthma as part of their philanthropic research. Research is focused on the effects of asthma on women, especially women of color. It has become a yearly organizational event for members of the Hermandad to participate in the annual Asthma Walk held in New York City.

Other Contributing Organizations
Besides focusing on their philanthropic research, members of Lambda Pi Upsilon also sponsor and contribute to other organizations. Some of these organizations are the MS Walk, March of Dimes, St. Jude's Children's Research Hospital, AIDS Walk, American Lung Association Lung Force Walk, Ronald McDonald House Charities, and Wildlife Conservation Society's "Save the Jaguar" to name a few.

Diva Affairs and Programs

Affairs
As part of the organization, members of Lambda Pi Upsilon host numerous annual events for Hermanas and other people to attend. Some of these events are:
Sisterhood Weekend
Sisterhood weekend is a legacy that was left by the Six Pillars of Strength for the hermanas of the sorority to go and bond with each other. The first sisterhood weekend was held on August 4–6, 1995 in SUNY Geneseo.
Emerald Gala
The Emerald Gala is an event hosted in New York City to celebrate the growth and the accomplishments of the organization.

Chapters

Undergraduate Chapters
Chapters of Lambda Pi Upsilon include:

Graduate chapters 
Zeta Alumnae/Professional Class Regions

Colonies
Colonies of Lambda Pi Upsilon include:

Membership and Orientation Process 
Lambda Pi Upsilon Sorority, Latinas Poderosas Unidas, Inc. welcomes women who are interested in a young and developing organization who also want to become leaders within their communities.

References

Lambda Pi Upsilon website
National Association of Latino Fraternal Organizations, Inc.,

External links
Lambda Pi Upsilon website

Student organizations established in 1992
Latino fraternities and sororities
1992 establishments in New York (state)